The Tai folk religion, or Satsana Phi ("religion of spirits"), or Ban Phi (Ahom: 𑜈𑜃𑜫 𑜇𑜣) is a form of animist religious beliefs intermixed with Buddhist beliefs traditionally and historically practiced by groups of ethnic Tai peoples. It is a syncretic mixture of Buddhist and Hindu practices with local traditional beliefs in mainland southeast Asia. Tai folk religion was a dominant native religion in mainland Southeast Asia until the arrival of Buddhism and Hinduism. 

Tai folk animist traditions are practiced by the various Tai ethnic groups (such as Lao, Ahom, Shan, Dai, Khamti, Isan, Central Thai etc.). These religions are animistic and polytheistic and their practice involves classes of shamans and ancestor worship. However they have a more syncretic nature and are partially Buddhist in nature. Often a family practises both Buddhism and animism.

Among the Lao, the Lao Loum and Lao Lom are predominantly Buddhist, while the Lao Theung and Lao Sung are predominantly folk religious. Tai folk animist traditions have also been incorporated into Laotian Buddhism.

Overview
Within the Satsana Phi belief system, supernatural deities (ຜີ, ผี) or gods can sometimes be the tutelary gods of buildings or territories, of natural places, or of things. Deities can also be ancestral spirits, or other types of spirits of seemingly supernatural forces. Such deities often interact with the world of the living, at times protecting people, and at other times seeming to cause harm. Guardian deities of places, such as the phi wat (ຜີວັດ, ผีวัด) of temples and the lak mueang (ຫລັກເມືອງ, หลักเมือง) of towns are celebrated and propitiated with communal gatherings and offerings of food. Gods of Hindu derivation are included in the Satsana Phi pantheon of gods, as well as several indigenous non-Hindu gods called phi thien  (ຜີແຖນ, ผีแถน).<ref>Poulsen, A. (2007). Childbirth and Tradition in Northeast Thailand. Copenhagen, Denmark: Nordic Institute of Asian Studies.</ref> Gods are ubiquitous, with some of them being associated with the universal elements: heaven, earth, fire, and water.

The belief system features thirty-two typically protective body-spirits known as the khwan (ຂວັນ, ขวัญ). At certain special occasions during the course of an individual's life, such as before a pending marriage, a job change, or at other times of high uncertainty, certain Baci (ບາສີ, บายศรี) ceremonies are sometimes performed for the benefit of an individual, with the aim of properly re-binding such "khwan" body-spirits back to one's body, as the unintentional loosening of such bonds is believed to possibly risk illness or harm. The baci rite calls on all thirty-two khwan to return to one's self to bestow health, prosperity, and well-being on the affected participant. During such ceremonies, cotton strings are often tied around a participant's wrists to keep the spirits in place. The baci ceremony can also be performed to welcome guests to one's home, before and after making a long trip, as a curing ritual or after recovery from an illness. The rite is also the central ritual for both the Lao Loum wedding ceremony and for the naming ceremony of a newborn child.

In daily life, most people pay respect to the deities that reside in spirit-houses, who are thought to protect the general vicinity of the spirit-house from harm. These spirit-houses are essentially miniature shrines, built to represent the presence of the deity of the shrine, just as a full size shrine is meant to represent such a "presence." Offerings of flowers, incense, and candles are given, and the spirits are consulted during times of change or hardship for protection and assistance. Natural deities include those that reside in trees, mountains, or forests.

Guardian spirits of people often include ancestors or angelic-beings who arrive at various points in life, better known as thewada. Malevolent spirits (phi phetu) include those khwan of people who were bad in past lives or died of tragic deaths, such as the ghastly phi pob (ຜີປອບ, ผีปอบ) and the vampirical phi dip (ຜີດິບ, ผีดิบ). Deities associated with specific places such as the household, the river, or a grove of trees are neither inherently benevolent nor evil, and occasional offerings ensure their favor and assistance in human affairs.

Priests: mophi
A class of priests called mophi (mo-phi ໝໍຜີ, หมอผี), "tellers", are locally trained shamans, specialists in the rituals and in communication with their personal angels and gods in general. Using trances, sacred objects imbued with supernatural power, or saksit, possessions, and rituals like lam phi fa (ລຳຜີຟ້າ, ลำผีฟ้า) or baci, the shaman is often consulted during times of trouble, hauntings, and illness or other misfortune that might be caused by malevolent or unhappy spirits. They are also usually present during religious festivals.

Ceremonies

Ceremonies devoted to the gods commonly involve an offering of a chicken and rice wine. Once the gods have taken the spiritual essence of the offering, people may consume the earthly remains. The head of a household or the individual who wants to gain the favor of the gods usually performs the ritual. In many villages, a person, usually an older man believed to have special knowledge of the gods, may be asked to choose an auspicious day for weddings or other important events, or for household rites.

Lowland Lao villages believe they are protected by the phi ban, which requires an annual offering to ensure the continued prosperity of the village. The village ritual specialist presides over this major ritual, which in the past often involved the sacrifice of a water buffalo and is still an occasion for closing the village to any outsiders for a day. To liang phi ban (feed the village spirit) also serves an important social function by reaffirming the village boundaries and the shared interests of all villagers.

For followers of Satsana Phi (Tai folk religious people), worship of ancestors is very important, although each ethnic group has different practices and beliefs. The Tai Ahom called it Phi Dam or ancestor god. The Khmu call spirits hrooy, and they are similar to the phi of the Lao Loum; the house spirit is particularly important, and spirits of wild places are to be avoided or barred from the village.

Variations
Ahom religion

The Ahom religion has the same belief in phi, khwan and ancestor worship. They offer chicken and a traditional rice beer, known as lao, in the Ancestor Worship ceremony of Phi Dam (Ancestor Spirit) and Ban-Phi (Village Spirit).

Lamet religion
The Lamet people have similar beliefs, and each village must have one ritualist (xemia), who is responsible for making all the sacrifices to village gods. He also supervises communal houses and officiates at the construction of any new houses. When a ritual practitioner dies, one of his sons is elected by the married men of the village to be his successor. If he has no sons, then one of his brother's sons is chosen.

Ancestral spirits (mbrong n'a) are very important to the Lamet because they look out for the well-being of the entire household. They live in the house, and no activity is undertaken without informing them of it. The spirits of the ancestors are fond of buffalos; thus buffalo skulls or horns from sacrifices are hung at the altar of the ancestors or under the gable of the house. Numerous taboos regarding behavior in the house are observed to avoid offending ancestral spirits.

See also
 Chinese folk religion
 Mo (religion)
 Vietnamese folk religion
 Yao folk religion
 Muong ethnic religion
 Thai folklore

References

Bibliography
 Yoshihisa Shirayama, Samlane Phompida, Chushi Kuroiwa. Malaria Control Alongside "Sadsana-Phee" (Animist Belief System) in Lao PDR. In: Modern Medicine and Indigenous Health Beliefs'', Vol 37 No. 4 July 2006.

External links
 Lao Heritage Foundation: Baci Ceremony.

Religion in Laos
Religion in Thailand
Asian shamanism
Tai history
Asian ethnic religion